Pasing-Obermenzing, is a borough of Munich. It is located west of the city center and has a population of about 74.000. It consists of the two districts Pasing and Obermenzing, which were both incorporated into Munich in 1938.

See also 
 Rubensstraße (Munich)

External links

References